Gaugler is a surname. Notable people with the surname include:

Eduard Gaugler (1928–2014), German researcher
Sarah Gaugler, Filipino-American tattoo artist, visual artist, designer, illustrator, model, actress, and musician
Yves Gaugler (born 1969), German footballer